Reality is the sum or aggregate of all that is real or existent within a system, as opposed to that which is only imaginary, nonexistent or nonactual. The term is also used to refer to the ontological status of things, indicating their existence. In physical terms, reality is the totality of a system, known and unknown. 

Philosophical questions about the nature of reality or existence or being are considered under the rubric of ontology, which is a major branch of metaphysics in the Western philosophical tradition. Ontological questions also feature in diverse branches of philosophy, including the philosophy of science, of religion, of mathematics, and philosophical logic. These include questions about whether only physical objects are real (i.e., physicalism), whether reality is fundamentally immaterial (e.g. idealism), whether hypothetical unobservable entities posited by scientific theories exist, whether a 'God' exists, whether numbers and other abstract objects exist, and whether possible worlds exist. Epistemology is concerned with what can be known or inferred as likely and how, whereby in the modern world emphasis is put on reason, empirical evidence and science as sources and methods to determine or investigate reality.

World views

World views and theories 

A common colloquial usage would have reality mean "perceptions, beliefs, and attitudes toward reality", as in "My reality is not your reality." This is often used just as a colloquialism indicating that the parties to a conversation agree, or should agree, not to quibble over deeply different conceptions of what is real. For example, in a religious discussion between friends, one might say (attempting humor), "You might disagree, but in my reality, everyone goes to heaven."

Reality can be defined in a way that links it to worldviews or parts of them (conceptual frameworks): Reality is the totality of all things, structures (actual and conceptual), events (past and present) and phenomena, whether observable or not. It is what a world view (whether it be based on individual or shared human experience) ultimately attempts to describe or map.

Certain ideas from physics, philosophy, sociology, literary criticism, and other fields shape various theories of reality. One such theory is that there simply and literally is no reality beyond the perceptions or beliefs we each have about reality. Such attitudes are summarized in the popular statement, "Perception is reality" or "Life is how you perceive reality" or "reality is what you can get away with" (Robert Anton Wilson), and they indicate anti-realism – that is, the view that there is no objective reality, whether acknowledged explicitly or not.

Many of the concepts of science and philosophy are often defined culturally and socially. This idea was elaborated by Thomas Kuhn in his book The Structure of Scientific Revolutions (1962). The Social Construction of Reality, a book about the sociology of knowledge written by Peter L. Berger and Thomas Luckmann, was published in 1966. It explained how knowledge is acquired and used for the comprehension of reality. Out of all the realities, the reality of everyday life is the most important one since our consciousness requires us to be completely aware and attentive to the experience of everyday life.

Related concepts

A priori and a posteriori

Potentiality and actuality

Belief

Belief studies

Western philosophy 
Philosophy addresses two different aspects of the topic of reality: the nature of reality itself, and the relationship between the mind (as well as language and culture) and reality.

On the one hand, ontology is the study of being, and the central topic of the field is couched, variously, in terms of being, existence, "what is", and reality. The task in ontology is to describe the most general categories of reality and how they are interrelated. If a philosopher wanted to proffer a positive definition of the concept "reality", it would be done under this heading. As explained above, some philosophers draw a distinction between reality and existence. In fact, many analytic philosophers today tend to avoid the term "real" and "reality" in discussing ontological issues. But for those who would treat "is real" the same way they treat "exists", one of the leading questions of analytic philosophy has been whether existence (or reality) is a property of objects. It has been widely held by analytic philosophers that it is not a property at all, though this view has lost some ground in recent decades.

Realism 
The view that there is a reality independent of any beliefs, perceptions, etc., is called realism. More specifically, philosophers are given to speaking about "realism about" this and that, such as realism about universals or realism about the external world. Generally, where one can identify any class of object, the existence or essential characteristics of which is said not to depend on perceptions, beliefs, language, or any other human artifact, one can speak of "realism about" that object.

A correspondence theory of knowledge about what exists claims that "true" knowledge of reality represents accurate correspondence of statements about and images of reality with the actual reality that the statements or images are attempting to represent. For example, the scientific method can verify that a statement is true based on the observable evidence that a thing exists. Many humans can point to the Rocky Mountains and say that this mountain range exists, and continues to exist even if no one is observing it or making statements about it.

Anti-realism
One can also speak of anti-realism about the same objects. Anti-realism is the latest in a long series of terms for views opposed to realism. Perhaps the first was idealism, so called because reality was said to be in the mind, or a product of our ideas. Berkeleyan idealism is the view, propounded by the Irish empiricist George Berkeley, that the objects of perception are actually ideas in the mind. In this view, one might be tempted to say that reality is a "mental construct"; this is not quite accurate, however, since, in Berkeley's view, perceptual ideas are created and coordinated by God. By the 20th century, views similar to Berkeley's were called phenomenalism. Phenomenalism differs from Berkeleyan idealism primarily in that Berkeley believed that minds, or souls, are not merely ideas nor made up of ideas, whereas varieties of phenomenalism, such as that advocated by Russell, tended to go farther to say that the mind itself is merely a collection of perceptions, memories, etc., and that there is no mind or soul over and above such mental events. Finally, anti-realism became a fashionable term for any view which held that the existence of some object depends upon the mind or cultural artifacts. The view that the so-called external world is really merely a social, or cultural, artifact, called social constructionism, is one variety of anti-realism. Cultural relativism is the view that social issues such as morality are not absolute, but at least partially cultural artifact.

Being 
The nature of being is a perennial topic in metaphysics. For, instance Parmenides taught that reality was a single unchanging Being, whereas Heraclitus wrote that all things flow. The 20th-century philosopher Heidegger thought previous philosophers have lost sight the question of Being (qua Being) in favour of the questions of beings (existing things), so that a return to the Parmenidean approach was needed. An ontological catalogue is an attempt to list the fundamental constituents of reality. The question of whether or not existence is a predicate has been discussed since the Early Modern period, not least in relation to the ontological argument for the existence of God. Existence, that something is, has been contrasted with essence, the question of what something is.
Since existence without essence seems blank, it associated with nothingness by philosophers such as Hegel. Nihilism represents an extremely negative view of being, the absolute a positive one.

Explanations for the existence of something rather than nothing

Perception 
The question of direct or "naïve" realism, as opposed to indirect or "representational" realism, arises in the philosophy of perception and of mind out of the debate over the nature of conscious experience; the epistemological question of whether the world we see around us is the real world itself or merely an internal perceptual copy of that world generated by neural processes in our brain. Naïve realism is known as direct realism when developed to counter indirect or representative realism, also known as epistemological dualism, the philosophical position that our conscious experience is not of the real world itself but of an internal representation, a miniature virtual-reality replica of the world.

Timothy Leary coined the influential term Reality Tunnel, by which he means a kind of representative realism. The theory states that, with a subconscious set of mental filters formed from their beliefs and experiences, every individual interprets the same world differently, hence "Truth is in the eye of the beholder". His ideas influenced the work of his friend Robert Anton Wilson.

Abstract objects and mathematics 
The status of abstract entities, particularly numbers, is a topic of discussion in mathematics.

In the philosophy of mathematics, the best known form of realism about numbers is Platonic realism, which grants them abstract, immaterial existence. Other forms of realism identify mathematics with the concrete physical universe.

Anti-realist stances include formalism and fictionalism.

Some approaches are selectively realistic about some mathematical objects but not others. Finitism rejects infinite quantities. Ultra-finitism accepts finite quantities up to a certain amount. Constructivism and intuitionism are realistic about objects that can be explicitly constructed, but reject the use of the principle of the excluded middle to prove existence by reductio ad absurdum.

The traditional debate has focused on whether an abstract (immaterial, intelligible) realm of numbers has existed in addition to the physical (sensible, concrete) world. A recent development is the mathematical universe hypothesis, the theory that only a mathematical world exists, with the finite, physical world being an illusion within it.

An extreme form of realism about mathematics is the mathematical multiverse hypothesis advanced by Max Tegmark. Tegmark's sole postulate is: All structures that exist mathematically also exist physically. That is, in the sense that "in those [worlds] complex enough to contain self-aware substructures [they] will subjectively perceive themselves as existing in a physically 'real' world". The hypothesis suggests that worlds corresponding to different sets of initial conditions, physical constants, or altogether different equations should be considered real. The theory can be considered a form of Platonism in that it posits the existence of mathematical entities, but can also be considered a mathematical monism in that it denies that anything exists except mathematical objects.

Properties 

The problem of universals is an ancient problem in metaphysics about whether universals exist. Universals are general or abstract qualities, characteristics, properties, kinds or relations, such as being male/female, solid/liquid/gas or a certain colour, that can be predicated of individuals or particulars or that individuals or particulars can be regarded as sharing or participating in. For example, Scott, Pat, and Chris have in common the universal quality of being human or humanity.

The realist school claims that universals are real – they exist and are distinct from the particulars that instantiate them. There are various forms of realism. Two major forms are Platonic realism and Aristotelian realism. Platonic realism is the view that universals are real entities and they exist independent of particulars. Aristotelian realism, on the other hand, is the view that universals are real entities, but their existence is dependent on the particulars that exemplify them.

Nominalism and conceptualism are the main forms of anti-realism about universals.

Time and space 

A traditional realist position in ontology is that time and space have existence apart from the human mind. Idealists deny or doubt the existence of objects independent of the mind. Some anti-realists whose ontological position is that objects outside the mind do exist, nevertheless doubt the independent existence of time and space.

Kant, in the Critique of Pure Reason, described time as an a priori notion that, together with other a priori notions such as space, allows us to comprehend sense experience. Kant denies that either space or time are substance, entities in themselves, or learned by experience; he holds rather that both are elements of a systematic framework we use to structure our experience. Spatial measurements are used to quantify how far apart objects are, and temporal measurements are used to quantitatively compare the interval between (or duration of) events. Although space and time are held to be transcendentally ideal in this sense, they are also empirically real, i.e. not mere illusions.

Idealist writers such as J. M. E. McTaggart in The Unreality of Time have argued that time is an illusion.

As well as differing about the reality of time as a whole, metaphysical theories of time can differ in their ascriptions of reality to the past, present and future separately.
 Presentism holds that the past and future are unreal, and only an ever-changing present is real.
 The block universe theory, also known as Eternalism, holds that past, present and future are all real, but the passage of time is an illusion. It is often said to have a scientific basis in relativity.
 The growing block universe theory holds that past and present are real, but the future is not.

Time, and the related concepts of process and evolution are central to the system-building metaphysics of A. N. Whitehead and Charles Hartshorne.

Possible worlds 
The term "possible world" goes back to Leibniz's theory of possible worlds, used to analyse necessity, possibility, and similar modal notions. Modal realism is the view, notably propounded by David Kellogg Lewis, that all possible worlds are as real as the actual world. In short: the actual world is regarded as merely one among an infinite set of logically possible worlds, some "nearer" to the actual world and some more remote. Other theorists may use the Possible World framework to express and explore problems without committing to it ontologically.
Possible world theory is related to alethic logic: a proposition is necessary if it is true in all possible worlds, and possible if it is true in at least one. The many worlds interpretation of quantum mechanics is a similar idea in science.

Theories of everything (TOE) and philosophy 

The philosophical implications of a physical TOE are frequently debated. For example, if philosophical physicalism is true, a physical TOE will coincide with a philosophical theory of everything.

The "system building" style of metaphysics attempts to answer all the important questions in a coherent way, providing a complete picture of the world. Plato and Aristotle could be said to be early examples of comprehensive systems. In the early modern period (17th and 18th centuries), the system-building scope of philosophy is often linked to the rationalist method of philosophy, that is the technique of deducing the nature of the world by pure a priori reason. Examples from the early modern period include the Leibniz's Monadology, Descartes's Dualism, Spinoza's Monism. Hegel's Absolute idealism and Whitehead's Process philosophy were later systems.

Other philosophers do not believe its techniques can aim so high. Some scientists think a more mathematical approach than philosophy is needed for a TOE, for instance Stephen Hawking wrote in A Brief History of Time that even if we had a TOE, it would necessarily be a set of equations. He wrote, "What is it that breathes fire into the equations and makes a universe for them to describe?"

Phenomenology 
On a much broader and more subjective level, private experiences, curiosity, inquiry, and the selectivity involved in personal interpretation of events shapes reality as seen by one and only one person and hence is called phenomenological. While this
form of reality might be common to others as well, it could at times also be so unique to oneself as to never be experienced or agreed upon by anyone else. Much of the kind of experience deemed spiritual occurs on this level of reality.

Phenomenology is a philosophical method developed in the early years of the twentieth century by Edmund Husserl and a circle of followers at the universities of Göttingen and Munich in Germany. Subsequently, phenomenological themes were taken up by philosophers in France, the United States, and elsewhere, often in contexts far removed from Husserl's work.

The word phenomenology comes from the Greek phainómenon, meaning "that which appears", and lógos, meaning "study". In Husserl's conception, phenomenology is primarily concerned with making the structures of consciousness, and the phenomena which appear in acts of consciousness, objects of systematic reflection and analysis. Such reflection was to take place from a highly modified "first person" viewpoint, studying phenomena not as they appear to "my" consciousness, but to any consciousness whatsoever. Husserl believed that phenomenology could thus provide a firm basis for all human knowledge, including scientific knowledge, and could establish philosophy as a "rigorous science".

Husserl's conception of phenomenology has also been criticised and developed by his student and assistant Martin Heidegger, by existentialists like Maurice Merleau-Ponty and Jean-Paul Sartre, and by other philosophers, such as Paul Ricoeur, Emmanuel Levinas, and Dietrich von Hildebrand.

Skeptical hypotheses 

Skeptical hypotheses in philosophy suggest that reality could be very different from what we think it is; or at least that we cannot prove it is not. Examples include:
 The "Brain in a vat" hypothesis is cast in scientific terms. It supposes that one might be a disembodied brain kept alive in a vat, and fed false sensory signals. This hypothesis is related to the Matrix hypothesis below.
 The "Dream argument" of Descartes and Zhuangzi supposes reality to be indistinguishable from a dream.
 Descartes' Evil demon is a being "as clever and deceitful as he is powerful, who has directed his entire effort to misleading me."
 The five minute hypothesis (or omphalos hypothesis or Last Thursdayism) suggests that the world was created recently together with records and traces indicating a greater age.
 Diminished reality refers to artificially diminished reality, not due to limitations of sensory systems but via artificial filters
 The Matrix hypothesis or Simulated reality hypothesis suggest that we might be inside a computer simulation or virtual reality. Related hypotheses may also involve simulations with signals that allow the inhabitant species in virtual or simulated reality to perceive the external reality.

Non-western ancient philosophy and religion

Jain philosophy 

Jain philosophy postulates that seven tattva (truths or fundamental principles) constitute reality. These seven tattva are:
 Jīva – The soul which is characterized by consciousness.
 Ajīva – The non-soul.
 Asrava – Influx of karma.
 Bandha – The bondage of karma.
 Samvara – Obstruction of the inflow of karmic matter into the soul.
 Nirjara – Shedding of karmas.
 Moksha – Liberation or Salvation, i.e. the complete annihilation of all karmic matter (bound with any particular soul).

Physical sciences

Scientific realism 
Scientific realism is, at the most general level, the view that the world (the universe) described by science (perhaps ideal science) is the real world, as it is, independent of what we might take it to be. Within philosophy of science, it is often framed as an answer to the question "how is the success of science to be explained?" The debate over what the success of science involves centers primarily on the status of entities that are not directly observable discussed by scientific theories. Generally, those who are scientific realists state that one can make reliable claims about these entities (viz., that they have the same ontological status) as directly observable entities, as opposed to instrumentalism. The most used and studied scientific theories today state more or less the truth.

Realism and locality in physics 
Realism in the sense used by physicists does not equate to realism in metaphysics.
The latter is the claim that the world is mind-independent: that even if the results of a measurement do not pre-exist the act of measurement, that does not require that they are the creation of the observer. Furthermore, a mind-independent property does not have to be the value of some physical variable such as position or momentum. A property can be dispositional (or potential), i.e. it can be a tendency: in the way that glass objects tend to break, or are disposed to break, even if they do not actually break. Likewise, the mind-independent properties of quantum systems could consist of a tendency to respond to particular measurements with particular values with ascertainable probability. Such an ontology would be metaphysically realistic, without being realistic in the physicist's sense of "local realism" (which would require that a single value be produced with certainty).

A closely related term is counterfactual definiteness (CFD), used to refer to the claim that one can meaningfully speak of the definiteness of results of measurements that have not been performed (i.e. the ability to assume the existence of objects, and properties of objects, even when they have not been measured).

Local realism is a significant feature of classical mechanics, of general relativity, and of electrodynamics; but quantum mechanics has shown that quantum entanglement is possible. This was rejected by Einstein, who proposed the EPR paradox, but it was subsequently quantified by Bell's inequalities. If Bell's inequalities are violated, either local realism or counterfactual definiteness must be incorrect; but some physicists dispute that experiments have demonstrated Bell's violations, on the grounds that the sub-class of inhomogeneous Bell inequalities has not been tested or due to experimental limitations in the tests. Different interpretations of quantum mechanics violate different parts of local realism and/or counterfactual definiteness.

The transition from "possible" to "actual" is a major topic of quantum physics, with related theories including quantum darwinism.

Role of "observation" in quantum mechanics 

The quantum mind–body problem refers to the philosophical discussions of the mind–body problem in the context of quantum mechanics. Since quantum mechanics involves quantum superpositions, which are not perceived by observers, some interpretations of quantum mechanics place conscious observers in a special position.

The founders of quantum mechanics debated the role of the observer, and of them, Wolfgang Pauli and Werner Heisenberg believed that it was the observer that produced collapse. This point of view, which was never fully endorsed by Niels Bohr, was denounced as mystical and anti-scientific by Albert Einstein. Pauli accepted the term, and described quantum mechanics as lucid mysticism.

Heisenberg and Bohr always described quantum mechanics in logical positivist terms. Bohr also took an active interest in the philosophical implications of quantum theories such as his complementarity, for example. He believed quantum theory offers a complete description of nature, albeit one that is simply ill-suited for everyday experiences – which are better described by classical mechanics and probability. Bohr never specified a demarcation line above which objects cease to be quantum and become classical. He believed that it was not a question of physics, but one of philosophy.

Eugene Wigner reformulated the "Schrödinger's cat" thought experiment as "Wigner's friend" and proposed that the consciousness of an observer is the demarcation line which precipitates collapse of the wave function, independent of any realist interpretation. Commonly known as "consciousness causes collapse", this controversial interpretation of quantum mechanics states that observation by a conscious observer is what makes the wave function collapse. However, this is a minority view among quantum philosophers, considering it a misunderstanding. There are other possible solutions to the "Wigner's friend" thought experiment, which do not require consciousness to be different from other physical processes. Moreover, Wigner shifted to those interpretations in his later years.

Multiverse 
The multiverse is the hypothetical set of multiple possible universes (including the historical universe we consistently experience) that together comprise everything that exists: the entirety of space, time, matter, and energy as well as the physical laws and constants that describe them. The term was coined in 1895 by the American philosopher and psychologist William James. In the many-worlds interpretation (MWI), one of the mainstream interpretations of quantum mechanics, there are an infinite number of universes and every possible quantum outcome occurs in at least one universe, albeit there is a debate as to how real the (other) worlds are.

The structure of the multiverse, the nature of each universe within it and the relationship between the various constituent universes, depend on the specific multiverse hypothesis considered. Multiverses have been hypothesized in cosmology, physics, astronomy, religion, philosophy, transpersonal psychology and fiction, particularly in science fiction and fantasy. In these contexts, parallel universes are also called "alternative universes", "quantum universes", "interpenetrating dimensions", "parallel dimensions", "parallel worlds", "alternative realities", "alternative timelines", and "dimensional planes", among others.

Anthropic principle

Personal and collective reality

Each individual has a different view of reality, with different memories and personal history, knowledge, personality traits and experience. This system, mostly referring to the human brain, affects cognition and behavior and into this complex new knowledge, memories, information, thoughts and experiences are continuously integrated. The connectome – neural networks/wirings in brains – is thought to be a key factor in human variability in terms of cognition or the way we perceive the world (as a context) and related features or processes. Sensemaking is the process by which people give meaning to their experiences and make sense of the world they live in. Personal identity is relating to questions like how a unique individual is persisting through time.

Sensemaking and determination of reality also occurs collectively, which is investigated in social epistemology and related approaches. From the collective intelligence perspective, the intelligence of the individual human (and potentially AI entities) is substantially limited and advanced intelligence emerges when multiple entities collaborate over time. Collective memory is an important component of the social construction of reality and communication and communication-related systems, such as media systems, may also be major components .

Philosophy of perception raises questions based on the evolutionary history of humans' perceptual apparatuses, particularly or especially individuals' physiological senses, described as "[w]e don't see reality — we only see what was useful to see in the past", partly suggesting that "[o]ur species has been so successful not in spite of our inability to see reality but because of it".

Scientific theories of everything 
A theory of everything (TOE) is a putative theory of theoretical physics that fully explains and links together all known physical phenomena, and predicts the outcome of any experiment that could be carried out in principle. The theory of everything is also called the final theory. Many candidate theories of everything have been proposed by theoretical physicists during the twentieth century, but none have been confirmed experimentally. The primary problem in producing a TOE is that general relativity and quantum mechanics are hard to unify. This is one of the unsolved problems in physics.

Initially, the term "theory of everything" was used with an ironic connotation to refer to various overgeneralized theories. For example, a great-grandfather of Ijon Tichy, a character from a cycle of Stanisław Lem's science fiction stories of the 1960s, was known to work on the "General Theory of Everything". Physicist John Ellis claims to have introduced the term into the technical literature in an article in Nature in 1986. Over time, the term stuck in popularizations of quantum physics to describe a theory that would unify or explain through a single model the theories of all fundamental interactions and of all particles of nature: general relativity for gravitation, and the standard model of elementary particle physics – which includes quantum mechanics – for electromagnetism, the two nuclear interactions, and the known elementary particles.

Current candidates for a theory of everything include string theory, M theory, and loop quantum gravity.

Technology

Media 

Media – such as news media, social media, websites including Wikipedia, and fiction – shape individuals' and society's perception of reality (including as part of belief and attitude formation) and are partly used intentionally as means to learn about reality. Various technologies have changed society's relationship with reality such as the advent of radio and TV technologies.

Research investigates interrelations and effects, for example aspects in the social construction of reality. A major component of this shaping and representation of perceived reality is agenda, selection and prioritization – not only (or primarily) the quality, tone and types of content – which influences, for instance, the public agenda. Disproportional news attention for low-probability incidents – such as high-consequence accidents – can distort audiences' risk perceptions with harmful consequences. Various biases such as false balance, public attention dependence reactions like sensationalism and domination by "current events", as well as various interest-driven uses of media such as marketing can also have major impacts on the perception of reality. Time-use studies found that e.g. in 2018 the average U.S. American "spent around eleven hours every day looking at screens".

Filter bubbles and echo chambers

Virtual reality and cyberspace 
Virtual reality (VR) is a computer-simulated environment that can simulate physical presence in places in the real world, as well as in imaginary worlds.

The virtuality continuum is a continuous scale ranging between the completely virtual, a virtuality, and the completely real: reality. The reality–virtuality continuum therefore encompasses all possible variations and compositions of real and virtual objects. It has been described as a concept in new media and computer science, but in fact it could be considered a matter of anthropology. The concept was first introduced by Paul Milgram.

The area between the two extremes, where both the real and the virtual are mixed, is the so-called mixed reality. This in turn is said to consist of both augmented reality, where the virtual augments the real, and augmented virtuality, where the real augments the virtual.
Cyberspace, the world's computer systems considered as an interconnected whole, can be thought of as a virtual reality; for instance, it is portrayed as such in the cyberpunk fiction of William Gibson and others. Second Life and MMORPGs such as World of Warcraft are examples of artificial environments or virtual worlds (falling some way short of full virtual reality) in cyberspace.

"RL" in internet culture 
On the Internet, "real life" refers to life in the real world. It generally references life or consensus reality, in contrast to an environment seen as fiction or fantasy, such as virtual reality, lifelike experience, dreams, novels, or movies. Online, the acronym "IRL" stands for "in real life", with the meaning "not on the Internet". Sociologists engaged in the study of the Internet have determined that someday, a distinction between online and real-life worlds may seem "quaint", noting that certain types of online activity, such as sexual intrigues, have already made a full transition to complete legitimacy and "reality". The abbreviation "RL" stands for "real life". For example, one can speak of "meeting in RL" someone whom one has met in a chat or on an Internet forum. It may also be used to express an inability to use the Internet for a time due to "RL problems".

See also 
 Alternate history
 Counterfactual history
 Derealization
 Extended modal realism
 Modal realism
 Hyperreality

Notes

References 
 
  Alt URL

Further reading
 George Musser, "Virtual Reality: How close can physics bring us to a truly fundamental understanding of the world?", Scientific American, vol. 321, no. 3 (September 2019), pp. 30–35.
"Physics is... the bedrock of the broader search for truth.... Yet [physicists] sometimes seem to be struck by a collective impostor syndrome.... Truth can be elusive even in the best-established theories. Quantum mechanics is as well tested a theory as can be, yet its interpretation remains inscrutable. [p. 30.] The deeper physicists dive into reality, the more reality seems to evaporate." [p. 34.]

External links 

 
 C.D. Broad on Reality
 Phenomenology Online: Materials discussing and exemplifying phenomenological research
 The Matrix as Metaphysics by David Chalmers

 
Abstraction
Concepts in aesthetics
Concepts in metaphysics
Philosophy of mind
Concepts in epistemology
Concepts in logic
Concepts in metaphilosophy
Concepts in the philosophy of language
Concepts in the philosophy of science
Consensus reality
Emergence
Empiricism
Epistemological theories
Metaphysical theories
Metaphysics of mind
Ontology
Religion
Philosophical logic
Philosophy of logic
Philosophy of mathematics
Philosophy of religion
Philosophy of technology
Qualia
Rationalism
Thought
Truth